Iván Álvarez (born 18 February 2000) is an Argentine professional footballer who plays as a midfielder for Sportivo Dock Sud.

Career
Álvarez began his career with Deportivo Morón. He was moved into the club's senior team during the 2018–19 Primera B Nacional campaign, first appearing in a matchday squad as an unused substitute on 4 November 2018 versus Gimnasia y Esgrima. His professional bow arrived on 19 November during a victory over Santamarina, with the midfielder netting his opening career goal in the process as they won 2–0.

In August 2021, Álvarez moved to Dock Sud on a loan deal. He continued at the club for the 2022 season.

Career statistics
.

References

External links

2000 births
Living people
People from Morón Partido
Argentine footballers
Association football midfielders
Primera Nacional players
Deportivo Morón footballers
Sportivo Dock Sud players
Sportspeople from Buenos Aires Province